Plestiodon ochoterenae, the Guerreran skink, is a species of lizard which is endemic to Mexico.

A 2021 study determined that it is most closely related to Plestiodon longiartus.

References

ochoterenae
Reptiles of Mexico
Reptiles described in 1933
Taxa named by Edward Harrison Taylor